Basil Salvador Valdez (born November 8, 1951) is a Filipino singer. He has received several Tinig Awards and the 1991 Tanglaw ng Lahi Award from Ateneo de Manila University.

Biography
Like many Filipino singers in the 1970s, Basil S. Valdez started on a solo career as a folk singer. In 1972, he joined the Circus Band and soon after it disbanded, he released his first solo album entitled Ngayon at Kailanman. While in the Circus Band, he met Ryan Cayabyab, who was then part of another band. When Valdez was preparing tracks for the album Ngayon at Kailanman, he asked Cayabyab to collaborate with and write a few songs for him, which the composer did. Cayabyab then became Valdez's musical director for 27 years. In the 1980s, Valdez re-invented himself as a singer of movie theme songs. Among the most memorable were "Paano Ba ang Mangarap", "Muling Buksan ang Puso" and "Paraisong Parisukat".
Valdez had throat cancer which sidelined his singing career in 1990. However, he recovered and found himself as a "healer". Valdez then sought the guidance of his Jesuit friends. They explained to him that he has gift of healing.

Discography

Albums
Ngayon at Kailanman (1977, Blackgold Records)
Basil (1978, Blackgold Records)
Ngayon (1979, Blackgold Records)
Corner of the Sky (1980, Blackgold Records)
Basil (1984, Blackgold Records)
Nagiisang Pangarap (1986, Blackgold Records)
Sundin Ang Loob Mo (1992, Viva Records)

Singles
 A Memory (1980)
 Ala-Ala
 Alay
 Alfie (1980)
 Ama
 Awit ng Buhay (1979)
 Babalik Ka Rin
 Bakas ng Lumipas
 Bakit Ka Nagbago? (1979)
 Basil S. Valdez (2011)
 Bayan Ko (1977) (original by Freddie Aguilar, also covered by Kuh Ledesma, also covered by Joanne Lorenzana)
 Bituing Marikit
 Buhay (1978)
 Bukas
 Buksan
 Corner of the Sky (1980)
 Dahil Sa Isang Bulaklak
 Dasal
 Dito
 Di Na Muling Mag-Iisa (duet with Pat Castillo)
 Dito Na Muling Mag-iisa (1986)
 Dito Nagwawakas (1978)
 Diyos Lamang ang Nakakaalam
 Don't Let Me Go (duet with Bambi Encarnacion) (1981)
 Dreamin' (1983)
 Fool That I Am (1983)
 From Now On
 Gaano Kadalas ang Minsan (1981) (covered by La Diva for the theme song of the 2008 teleserye, and Christian Bautista for the teleserye, "Walang Hanggan" in 2012)
 Gabing Kulimlim
 Galing Sa Puso
 Hanap-Hanap Ka (1986)
 Hanggang
 Hanggang Kailan Kaya? (1977)
 Hanggang Sa Dulo ng Walang Hanggan (1977) (also covered by Gary V. and Nina for the teleserye, "Walang Hanggan" in 2012)
 Hawak Mo ang Panahon (1979)
 Hindi Kita Malilimutan (1983) (also covered by Bukas Palad in 1986, also covered by Gary V. in 2000)
 I Just Think You're Beautiful (1981)
 Iduyan Mo (1979)
 Ikaw
 Ikaw, Lamang Pala (1986)
 Ikaw Na Nga
 Imortal
 Inang Mahal (1986)
 Iyong Mga Yapak
 Iyong Pag-ibig
 Kahit Ako'y Lupa (1978)
 Kahit Ika'y Panaginip Lang (1978) (also covered by Nyoy Volante with Mannos in 2003)
 Kahit Na Magtiis (1986) (also covered by Joseph Estrada and Ariel Rivera)
 Kaibigan
 Kaibigang Kalikasan (1979)
 Kailan (1977)
 Kailan Pa (1979)
 Kanlungan (2011) (original by Buklod with Noel Cabangon)
 Kastilyong Buhangin (1977)
 Kay Ganda ng Daigdig (1977)
 Kayumanggi (1979)
 Kristo
 Kundiman (1986)
 Kung Ako Na Lang Sana (2011) (original by Bituin Escalante in 2002, also covered by Sharon Cuneta, Vina Morales for the teleserye Impostor in 2010, Martin Nievera in 2013, & December Avenue in 2017)
 Kung Ako'y Iiwan Mo (1977)
 Kung Nagsasayaw Kita
 Kunin Mo (1981)
 Labis Kitang Minamahal (1978)
 Lagi Kitang Naaalala
 Lagi Na Lang (duet with Leah Navarro)
 Laya (1977)
 Lead Me Lord (1983) (also covered by Gary V. in 2000)
 Let the Pain Remain (1980) (also covered by Side A Band in 1998)
 Lift Up Your Hands (1980) (also covered by Gary V. in 2000 and in 2017, Kathryn Bernardo covered the song in her 2nd album "Lovelife with Kath")
 Love Card (1981)
 Love Is the Reason
 Madaling Araw
 Magtitiis (duet with Pilita Corrales)
 Mahiwaga
 Maria
 Maybe (1981)
 Michel Legrand Medley (1980)
 Minsan Pa (also covered by Sharon Cuneta)
 Minsan Pa Nating Hagkan ang Nakaraan (1983)
 Muling Buksan ang Puso (1985) (also covered by Erik Santos in 2013)
 Muntik Nang Maabot ang Langit (2011) (original by True Faith Band in 1994)
 Nag-Iisang Pangarap (1986)
 Nais Ko (1978) (also covered by the late Francis M. & also covered by Ogie Alcasid in 2012)
 Narito Ka (1986)
 Nariyan Ka Rin (1983)
 Ngayon (1979)
 Ngayon at Kailanman (1977) (also covered by Jan Nieto as the theme song of the 2009 teleserye of the same title, Vina Morales for the 2010 teleserye Kristine, Ariel Rivera for the 2012 teleserye Ina, Kapatid, Anak, and Jona for 2018 teleserye of the same title)
 Paalam (1979)
 Paano Ba ang Mangarap? (1981)
 Paano Na Kaya?
 Pagdating ng Panahon (with The Company) (2011) (original by Ice Seguerra in 2001, also 2nd covered by Martin Nievera in 2006, and another 3rd covered by Kathryn Bernardo for the 2013 teleserye Got to Believe)
 Pagputi ng Uwak (1978) (original soundtrack)
 Pagsinta'y Pang-Araw at Ulan (1977)
 Panahon (1981)
 Pangarap Ko'y Ikaw (1978)
 Paraisong Parisukat (1977)
 Pintig ng Dibdib (1986)
 Sa Ugoy ng Duyan (also covered by Jeremiah Boy Group in 1999)
 Salamat Ama
 Salamat Maria (2007) (in celebration of the Centenary of the Canonical Coronation of Our Lady of the Holy Rosary La Naval de Manila)
 Salamin ng Buhay (1983)
 Sana ay Ikaw Na Nga (1981) (also covered by Vina Morales)
 Sana'y Maghintay ang Walang Hanggan (also covered by Zsa Zsa Padilla)
 Sana'y Malaya Ako
 Sapagka't Kami ay Tao Lamang
 Say That You Love Me (1983) (also covered by Martin Nievera in 1989)
 Show Me the Way
 Sino ang Baliw (1983) (original by Mon Del Rosario in 1981, also covered by Kuh Ledesma in 1983)
 Siya Na Ba? (1979)
 Sometime, Somewhere (1980)
 Stars (1983)
 Sumasamba
 Sundin ang Loob Mo
 Tanging Yaman (Original by Bukas Palad, also covered by Carol Banawa and Agot Isidro)
 The Harder I Try, The Bluer I Get (2003) (original by The Free Movement & part of the various artists album, "The Best of Crossover Presents" released by VIVA Records Corp. & 105.1 Crossover)
 The Power of Love
 Tuldukan Na'ng Hapis (1983)
 Tunay Na Ligaya (1986) (also covered by Ariel Rivera in 1996 from the various artists album, "Ryan Cayabyab @ 25: The Silver Album by Sony Music Philippines in 1996)
 Tuwing Umuulan at Kapiling Ka (1980) (also covered by Regine Velasquez, Eraserheads & Noel Cabangon)
 We're Falling in Love (duet with Angela Bofill)
 Where Am I Going? (1980)
 With You (1980)
 You (1980)

References

1951 births
Living people
20th-century Filipino male singers
Singers from Manila
Vicor Music artists